Koosa is a village in Peipsiääre Parish, Tartu County in eastern Estonia.

See also
Lake Koosa

References 

Villages in Tartu County
Kreis Dorpat